Mike Grennan (November 29, 1950 - May 12, 2009) was an American curler and 1988 national men's champion.

Curling career
In 1988 Grennan played lead on Doug Jones' national champion team; they went on to finish in tenth place at the World Championship.

Teams

References

External links 

1950 births
2009 deaths
American male curlers
American curling champions
Place of birth missing
Place of death missing